The Matipu people are an indigenous people of Brazil. They live in the southern part of the Xingu Indigenous Park in the state of Mato Grosso. Their a population is estimated at about 149 individuals in 2011, up from population of 40 in the 1995 census. They are mainly of animist faith and share many cultural traits with other Xingu peoples.

Name
They are also known as the Mariape-Nahuqua and Matipuhy.

Language
The Matipu traditional spoke the Matipu language, a Carib language, but there are no longer any known living speakers. They currently speak the Kuikúro-Kalapálo language.

Subsistence
To provide for themselves, the Matipu hunt, fish, and farm. Manioc and maize are their primary crops.

See also
Indigenous peoples in Brazil
List of Indigenous peoples in Brazil
Indigenous peoples of the Americas

References

External links
Languages of Brazil at Ethnologue

Xingu peoples
Indigenous peoples in Brazil
Indigenous peoples of the Amazon